Mustapha Laribi born January 8, 1969) is an Algerian film actor.

Acting career
Algerian actor graduated from the Higher Institute of Arts Theater with his artistic credentials, which included many successful dramas such as the series 'hearts in conflict', 'blue band' 'social series' secrets in addition to 'difficult exam', which won the Golden Art Award for best A secondary role for men, in a new film entitled "Seven Walls of the Citadel" Algerian director "Ahmed Rachedi", where our speaker embodies the role of "Kaid Gaballah," an educated figure located between the fire of his son who joined the ranks of the National Liberation Front and the fire of his belief in the need to avoid Face the French enemy

Filmography

Awards
 2007: Fennec d'or Best male role Actor – Won

References

External links
 

Algerian male film actors
People from Tipaza
21st-century Algerian male actors